Joël Millard (born 23 January 1946) is a French racing cyclist. He rode in the 1972 Tour de France.

References

1946 births
Living people
French male cyclists
Place of birth missing (living people)